Augustobriga may refer to the following (Roman/Celtiberian) places in Iberia (Hispaniae) :

 in Spain 
 Ciudad Rodrigo, city  
 El Puente del Arzobispo, in Toledo province
 Muro de Ágreda, a Roman colonia on the former territory of the Pellendones in Hispania Terraconensis province, founded by Augustus, later in the Roman Catholic Diocese of Tarazona
 Talavera la Vieja, in province of Cáceres, Extremadura.